The Pennsylvania State Game Lands Number 25 are Pennsylvania State Game Lands in Elk County in Pennsylvania in the United States providing hunting, bird watching, and other activities.

Geography
State Game Lands Number 25 is located in the City of St. Marys, and in Jones and Ridgway Townships in Elk County.

Nearby communities include the City of Saint Marys, the borough of Johnsonburg, and census-designated places and populated places Boot Jack, Dagus, Dagus Mines, Dahoga, Earlyville, Fairview Glen Hazel, Grandview, Instanter, Kaulmont, Kersey, Ketner, Lynchville, Midmont, Montmorenci, Paine, Rasselas, Rathbun, Ridgeway, Rolfe, Shelvey, Straight Creek, Streights, Swissmont, Tambine, Whistletown, Wilcox, and Williamsville.

U.S. Route 219 passes north/south immediately west of the Game Lands, Pennsylvania Route 120 is east/west oriented just south of SGL 25, Pennsylvania Route 255 passes through north/south through the Game Lands and Pennsylvania Route 948 passes north/south to the west connecting with Routes 219 and 120.

Almost all of SGL 25 is part of the Clarion River watershed, which is part of the Allegheny River watershed. Tributaries include Bendigo Run, Crooked Creek, Dutch Creek, East Branch Clarion River (which includes the East Branch Clarion River Lake), Elk Creek, Maple Run, Middle Fork East Branch Clarion River, Powers Run, Rocky Run, Seventy One, Silver Run, South Fork Straight Creek and Water Tank Run. The southeast portion of the Game Lands is drained by West Creek, part of the Susquehanna River watershed. Tributaries include Bear Run, Kay Fork, Little Bear Run and North Fork West Creek.

Other Pennsylvania State Game Lands within 30 miles include 14, 28, 30, 34, 44, 54, 61, 62, 77, 94, 293, 301, 311, and 331. Other nearby protected areas include Allegheny National Forest, Elk State Park, Kinzua Bridge State Park and Parker Dam State Park.

Statistics
SGL 25 is of two parcels consisting of .The coordinates of the two parcels are

Biology
SGL 25 terrain consists of flat mountain tops and narrow valleys, entirely forested. Game species include bear (Ursus americanus), White-tailed deer (Odocoileus virginianus) and turkey (Meleagris gallopavo).

See also
Pennsylvania State Game Lands
Pennsylvania State Game Lands Number 14, also located in Elk County
Pennsylvania State Game Lands Number 28, also located in Elk County

References

External links
https://viewer.nationalmap.gov/advanced-viewer/
http://geonames.usgs.gov/apex/f?p=gnispq:3:::NO::P3_FID:1210215
https://www.pgc.pa.gov/HuntTrap/StateGameLands/Documents/SGL%20Maps/SGL__025.pdf

025
Protected areas of Elk County, Pennsylvania